Heliothela aterrima is a moth of the family Crambidae. It was described by Turner in 1937. It is found in Australia, where it has been recorded from New South Wales.

References

Moths described in 1937
Heliothelini